Nord University is a state university in the Nordland and Trøndelag counties of Norway. The university has 11,000 students at study locations in Northern and Central Norway, with main campuses in Bodø, the capital of the county of Nordland, and Levanger, a university town located on the south shore of the Trondheim Fjord. Further campuses are located in Mo i Rana, Namsos, Nesna, Sandnessjøen, Steinkjer, Stjørdal, and Vesterålen.

The university is committed to a broad scope of educational and research programmes, with a focus on blue and green growth, innovation and entrepreneurship, as well as welfare, health and education. Nord University offers 180 programmes within both academic and professional studies, including aquaculture, sociology, business education, nurse education, and teacher education.

The university is named after the Norwegian word for North, Nord, in order to emphasise its devotion to northern regions. A member of the University of the Arctic, Nord University is a hub in the international network of universities offering circumpolar studies.

History 

Established in its current form on 1 January 2016 following a resolution of 9 October 2015 by the King-in-Council, Nord University is the successor of the University of Nordland (est. 2011), Nesna University College (est. 1994), and Nord-Trøndelag University College (est. 1994). The latter colleges originated as Nesna Teachers' College (test. 1918), and Levanger Teachers' College (est. 1892). The latter institution was a direct successor of the Klæbu Teacher's College (est. 1839).

Faculties

Faculty of Biosciences and Aquaculture 

The Faculty of Biosciences and Aquaculture (FBA) promotes sustainable and innovative development in order to meet global challenges related to food production, climate and the environment. The Faculty is an international arena for education, research and knowledge dissemination, with staff members and students from over 25 countries. The Faculty offers a doctoral programme (PhD) within aquatic biosciences.

The Faculty of Biosciences and Aquaculture has 800 students and 130 staff members in Bodø and Steinkjer. The teaching and research community comprises three academic divisions: 
 Aquaculture
 Ecology, Genomics and Animal Science
 Production and Welfare.

Faculty of Education and Arts 

The Faculty of Education and Arts (FLU) educates teachers from preschool to upper secondary school, and within sports, culture, and the fine arts. Research in the faculty emphasizes the teaching profession and professional teaching practices. FLU offers a doctoral program (PhD) in the study of professional praxis. Beyond its teacher training programs, the faculty also provides full bachelor degrees in disciplines such as Sports Science and English Literature. It also offers a range of Master degrees, including Speech Therapy and Music.

The Faculty of Education and Arts has 3500 students, and 350 academic faculty and administrative staff members in Bodø, Levanger, Vesterålen, and Nesna. The teaching and research community comprises eight academic divisions:
 Teacher Education 
 Pre-School Teacher Education
 Language and Literature
 Arts and Culture
 Physical Education, Sports and Outdoor Life 
 Pedagogy and Special Education
 Social Studies and Religion, Philosophy & Ethics
 Science 
The Faculty of Education and Arts is also host to several centres:

 Norwegian Centre for Arts and Culture in Education
 Centre for Saami and Indigenous Studies
 National Competence Centre for Culture, Health, and Care
 Centre for Special Education Research and Inclusion
 Centre for Education for Sustainable Development and Global Citizenship

Faculty of Nursing and Health Sciences 

The Faculty of Nursing and Health Sciences (FSH) educates nurses and specialists within healthcare and practice-based research. The faculty offers an interfaculty doctoral programme (PhD) within professional praxis.

The Faculty of Nursing and Health Sciences has 2400 students and 200 staff members. The teaching and research community comprises three academic divisions: 
 Nursing
 Pharmacy
 Social Education and Mental Health

Faculty of Social Science 

The Faculty of Social Science (FSV) focuses on welfare, development and communication. The Faculty offers a doctoral programme (PhD) within sociology.

The Faculty of Social Science has 1800 students and 100 staff members. The teaching and research community comprises four academic divisions: 
 Welfare and Social Relations
 History, Culture and Media
 Management and Innovation
 International Relations, Circumpolar Studies and Environment

Nord Business School  
Nord Business School (HHN) prioritizes cooperation with business and industry, the public sector, and the community, to provide relevant education at the bachelor, master, and doctorate levels. The faculty offers a doctoral programme (PhD) within business management.

Nord Business School has 2800 students and 230 staff members. The teaching and research community comprises four academic divisions: 
 Innovation and Entrepreneurship
 Markets, Strategy and Management
 Economic Analysis and Accounting
 Traffic

HHN also includes the Center for High North Logistics .

High North Center
The High North Center, which runs in the HNN, is a national center for research, education and policy development in the High North of Norway. The center recognizes and develops innovation, business creation and politics. The was established in 2007 to focuses on assisting companies, organizations and public institutions to increase both awareness and commitment in the High North. The center's leader is Frode Mellemvik.

Academics 
Most of the programmes at Nord University are taught in Norwegian, but the institution does offer a growing range of options both taught and administered in English:

PhD Degrees in English 
 PhD in Aquatic Biosciences
 PhD in Business
 PhD in the Study of Professional Praxis
 PhD in Sociology

Master Degrees in English 
 Business
 Biosciences
 Nordic Master in Sustainable Production and Utilization of Marine Bioresources

Bachelor Degrees in English 

 Animal Science 

 Biology
 Circumpolar Studies
 English Language and Literature
 Games and Entertainment Technology
 Film and Television production

One-Year Programmes in English 

 Circumpolar Studies
 English Language and Literature
 Norwegian Language and Society

One-Semester Programmes in English 

 Advanced English Language and Literature
 Adventure Knowledge
 Aquaculture and Marine Biosciences
 Business
 Ecology and Arctic Marine Biology
 Experience English Language and Literature
 Extreme Environments
 International Marketing
 Introduction to Norwegian society, welfare, development and language
 Molecular Biosciences
 Nordic Politics and Society
 Nordic and International Perspectives on Teaching and Learning

Single Courses in English 
In addition to the established programme packages, students may choose from a selection of courses taught in English, which include (among others):
 Business English 
 History, Politics, and Northern Resources
 International Entrepreneurship
 Literature and Environmental Catastrophe
 Management
 Security Politics
 Shakespeare and his World
 The Nordic Societies

See also 
 Higher education in Norway

References

External links 
 Official website 
 High North Dialogue

 
Universities and colleges in Norway
Educational institutions established in 2016
Education in Nordland
Education in Trøndelag
Organisations based in Bodø
Universities and colleges formed by merger in Norway
2016 establishments in Norway